Urgent may refer to:
 Urgent (American band), a 1980s band from New York City
 Urgent (Canadian band), a 1980s band from Toronto, Ontario, Canada
 "Urgent" (song), a 1981 song by Foreigner
 Urgent! Records, a former record company

See also
Urge (disambiguation)
Urgency (disambiguation)
Urgenta, 3468 Urgenta, minor planets
Urgenda (portmanteau of urgent and agenda), Dutch NGO